The Dark Tower is a mystery drama by George S. Kaufman and Alexander Woollcott, first produced in 1933.
The play was later adapted for the Warner Bros. film The Man with Two Faces (1934) starring Mary Astor, Louis Calhern, and Edward G. Robinson.

In January 1938, future President of the United States Richard Nixon was cast in the Whittier Community Players production of this play. He was cast opposite a high school teacher named Thelma "Pat" Ryan, whom he would later marry.

A half-hour radio adaptation, starring Orson Welles, was broadcast on the Suspense! radio program on May 4, 1944. A recording can be found on the Internet Archive.

References
4.  Radio Echoes https://www.radioechoes.com/?page=play_download&mode=play&dl_mp3folder=S&dl_file=suspense_1944-05-04_the_dark_tower.mp3&dl_series=Suspense&dl_title=The%20Dark%20Tower&dl_date=1944.05.04&dl_size=6.79%20MB

1933 plays
Plays by George S. Kaufman
American plays adapted into films